Glendale Union High School District No. 205 is a school district headquartered in Glendale, Arizona, United States.

The union high school district operates nine comprehensive high schools and serves most of Glendale and a portion of Phoenix. It is the second largest high school-only district preceded by Phoenix Union.

Glendale Union High School District schools receive the graduates of the Washington Elementary School District, Glendale Elementary School District, and many students from the Madison School District.  Glendale Elementary district is located in Glendale, Arizona, Madison schools are in North Central Phoenix and the Washington Elementary schools are in North Phoenix and Sunnyslope.

Schools

Zoned
 Apollo (Glendale) – opened 1970
 Cortez (Phoenix) – opened 1960
 Glendale (Glendale) – opened 1911
 Greenway (Phoenix) – opened 1973
 Independence (Glendale) – opened 1977
 Moon Valley (Phoenix) – opened 1965
 Sunnyslope (Phoenix) – opened 1953
 Thunderbird (Phoenix) – opened 1972
 Washington (Phoenix) – opened 1955

Alternative
The GUHSD Online Learning Academy (formerly "Christown Academy" and "Metrocenter Academy"), is an alternative high school. It admits students who wish to take online courses, and it offers high school diplomas but not GEDs. In 2018–19 it had 247 students enrolled.

Feeder school districts
 Glendale Elementary School District
 Washington Elementary School District
 Madison Elementary School District

References

External links

School districts in Maricopa County, Arizona